St. James High School was a coeducational Catholic high school in Ferndale, Michigan, United States.  It closed in 1971.

References

Defunct Catholic secondary schools in Michigan